Hyalomma truncatum, also known as the shiny hyalomma or small smooth bont-legged tick, is a species of hard tick in the family Ixodidae. It is found in Africa.

References

Further reading

 

Ticks
Ixodidae
Arachnids of Africa
Taxa named by Carl Ludwig Koch
Animals described in 1844
Articles created by Qbugbot